Kirsh is a surname. Notable people with the surname include:

David Kirsh (born 1950), Canadian cognitive scientist
Herb Kirsh (1929-2014), American politician
Nathan Kirsh (born 1932), South African-born business magnate
Philip Kirsh (born 1964/65), businessman

See also
Kirsch